Morehouse is a ghost town in Morrow County, in the U.S. state of Ohio.

History
The first settlement at Morehouse was made in the 1830s by Stephen Morehouse. The town once had its own schoolhouse.

References

Geography of Morrow County, Ohio
Ghost towns in Ohio
1830s establishments in Ohio
Populated places established in the 1830s